2-Chloropropionic acid (2-chloropropanoic acid) is the chemical compound with the formula CH3CHClCO2H. This colorless liquid is the simplest chiral chlorocarboxylic acid, and it is noteworthy for being readily available as a single enantiomer.  The conjugate base of 2-chloropropionic acid (CH3CHClCO2−), as well as its salts and esters, are known as 2-chloropropionates or 2-chloropropanoates.

Preparation
Racemic 2-chloropropionic acid is produced by chlorination of propionyl chloride followed by hydrolysis of the 2-chloropropionyl chloride.  Enantiomerically pure (S)-2-chloropropionic acid can be prepared from L-alanine via diazotization in hydrochloric acid.  Other α-amino acids undergo this reaction.

Reactions
Reduction of (S)-2-chloropropionic acid with lithium aluminium hydride affords (S)-2-chloropropanol, the simplest chiral chloro-alcohol.  This alcohol undergoes cyclization upon treatment with potassium hydroxide, which causes dehydrohalogenation to give the epoxide, (R)-propylene oxide (methyloxirane).

2-Chloropropionyl chloride reacts with isobutylbenzene to give, after hydrolysis, ibuprofen.

Safety
In general, α-halocarboxylic acids and their esters are good alkylating agents and should be handled with care.  2-Chloropropionic acid is a neurotoxin.

See also
 2,2-Dichloropropionic acid

References

Carboxylic acids
Organochlorides